Pilgrim Beware was a Chicago Americana band together from 1994-1999. Fronted by singer/songwriter Jennifer Thornbury (née Paul), currently of El Gato Roboto, and including Stephen Dorocke (Handsome Family, Freakwater) on pedal steel, guitar, accordion, and mandolin, Brian Doyle on guitar and harmonica, Tom Musick on bass, and Randy Jezierski on drums. Occasional and past members also included Heath Chappell (The New Invaders) on drums, Joe Shepley (drums), Liza Waxman (bass) and Ryan Hembrey (upright bass).

Discography

"Shanghaied & Haunted" 1999

References

Musical groups established in 1993
Musical groups disestablished in 1999
Musical groups from Chicago